Congratulations, It's a Boy! is a 1971 American made-for-television comedy film directed by William A. Graham and starring Bill Bixby and Diane Baker. It originally premiered as the ABC Movie of the Week on September 21, 1971.

Plot
A swinging bachelor has to grow up after his young 16-year-old illegitimate son he did not know about shows up and wants to spend time with him.

Cast
Bill Bixby as Johnny Gaines
Diane Baker as Edye
Jack Albertson as Al Gaines
Ann Sothern as Ethel Gaines
Karen Jensen as Rhonda Lewis
Darrell Larson as B.J.
Tom Bosley as Herb

Reception
The Los Angeles Times called it "forgettable".

References

External links

1971 television films
1971 films
1971 comedy films
American comedy films
ABC Movie of the Week
Films scored by Basil Poledouris
Films produced by Aaron Spelling
Films directed by William Graham (director)
1970s English-language films
1970s American films